360 photography may refer to:

 360 panorama, a photograph spanning a full circle in side
 360-degree video
 360-degree interactive photography
 360 product photography, the rotational photography of a subject

See also 
 Image stitching
 Photogrammetry